Sakar (Сакар) is a small village next to Mali Zvornik in the Mačva District of Serbia. It has a population of 504 people. The village is on Lake Zvornik (Зворнико језеро).  It is near a hydroelectric power station.

History 
There were only two Muslim villages on the right side of the Drina river in 1862: Mali Zvonrik and Sakar.  Sakar came under the administration of the Principality of Serbia when it became internationally recognized as a condition of the Treaty of Berlin. After this event, Serbian families began to move into the village. The nearby hydroelectric power station was completed in 1954, and the resulting inundation of farmland depleted the traditional Muslim population of the village.

Historical population

1948: 451
1953: 423
1961: 499
1971: 508
1981: 587
1991: 633
2002: 504

Ethnic groups in Sakar (2002)

References

See also
List of places in Serbia

Populated places in Mačva District